(410777) 2009 FD is a carbonaceous sub-kilometer asteroid and binary system, classified as near-Earth object and potentially hazardous asteroid of the Apollo group, discovered on 24 February 2009 by astronomers of the Spacewatch program at Kitt Peak National Observatory near Tucson, Arizona, in the United States.

Until 2019, the asteroid's modelled orbit placed it at risk of a possible future collision with Earth in 2185. With a Palermo Technical Impact Hazard Scale rating of -0.44, it had the fifth highest impact threat of all known asteroids based on its estimated diameter, kinetic yield, impact probability, and time interval. Observations to 2019 extended the observation arc by four years and detected a favourable Yarkovsky effect, which ruled out impact in 2185. Using observations from 16 November 2020, the asteroid was removed from the Sentry risk table on 19 November 2020.

Discovery

 was initially announced as discovered on 16 March 2009 by La Sagra Sky Survey. It brightened to roughly apparent magnitude 19.3 around mid-March 2014. The October–November 2015 Earth approach was studied by the Goldstone Deep Space Network.

Binary 

NASA's Near Earth Program originally estimated its size to be 130 metres in diameter based on an assumed albedo of 0.15. This gave it an estimated mass of around 2,800,000 tonnes. But work by Amy Mainzer using NEOWISE data in 2014 showed that it could be as large as 472 metres with an albedo as low as 0.01. Because  (K09F00D) was only detected in two (W1+W2) of the four wavelengths the suspected NEOWISE diameter is more of an upper limit. Radar observations in 2015 showed it to be a binary asteroid. The primary is 120–180 meters in diameter and the secondary is 60–120 meters in diameter.

Future approaches

The JPL Small-Body Database shows that  will make two very close approaches in the late 22nd century, in 2185 and 2190. As of 2016, the approach of 29 March 2185 had a 1 in 710 chance of impacting Earth. Orbit determination for 2190 is complicated by the 2185 close approach. The precise distance that it will pass from Earth and the Moon on 29 March 2185 will determine the 30 March 2190 distance.  should pass closer to the Moon than Earth on 29 March 2185. An impact by  would cause severe devastation to a large region or tsunamis of significant size.

Past Earth-impact estimates 

In January 2011, near-Earth asteroid  (with observations through 7 December 2010) was listed on the JPL Sentry Risk Table with a 1 in 435 chance of impacting Earth on 29 March 2185. In 2014 (with observations through 5 February 2014, creating an observation arc of 1807 days) the potential 2185 impact was ruled out. Using the 2014 observations, the Yarkovsky effect has become more significant than the position uncertainties. The Yarkovsky effect has resulted in the 2185 virtual impactor returning. While  was estimated to be 470 meters in diameter, it was rated −0.40 on the Palermo Scale, placing it higher on the Sentry Risk Table than any other known object at the time.

On 14 June 2019, Alessio Del Vigna and colleagues published a new analysis, which incorporates astrometry taken in 2019. The 2019 observations extended the observation arc from six years to ten years. This ruled out the 2185 impact possibility, leaving the potential impact in 2190 as the only theoretically possible impact until 2250, at a very low probability of 1 in 100 million. On 19 November 2020, the asteroid was finally completely removed from the sentry risk table as all possible impacts, including 2190 and 2250, were ruled out.

See also 
 List of asteroid close approaches to Earth, for other close approaches

Notes

References

External links 
 Planetary Radar Science Group
 ESA/ESO Collaboration Successfully Tracks Its First Potentially Threatening Near-Earth Object (ESO 21 January 2014)
 
 
 

410777
410777
410777
410777
410777
410777
410777
Near-Earth objects in 2014
20090224